Muyama is an administrative ward in Buhigwe District  of Kigoma Region of Tanzania. In 2016 the Tanzania National Bureau of Statistics report there were 11,487 people in the ward, from 10,436 in 2012.

Villages / neighborhoods 
The ward has 3 villages and 12 hamlets.

 Nyanga 
 Nyasore
 Madukani
 Nyampemba Juu
 Nyampemba Chini
 Kalege 
 Kalege
 Kavuruga
 Nyampemba
 Nyarubanga
 Kasumo 
 Kasumo
 Kamana
 Mihesu
 Kishigwe

References

Buhigwe District
Wards of Kigoma Region